Kaizuka may refer to:

 Kaizuka, Osaka, a city located in Osaka
 Nishitetsu Kaizuka Line, a Japanese railway line in Fukuoka prefecture
 7475 Kaizuka, an asteroid
 A cultivar of Juniperus chinensis tree
 Hiroshi Kaizuka, manga artist; see List of series run in Weekly Shōnen Sunday
 Hiroko Kaizuka, a character in the manga series Shadow Star